Burudi Ali Johnson (born October 1, 1979) is an American former professional football player who was a running back for eight seasons in the National Football League (NFL). He was drafted by the Cincinnati Bengals in the fourth round of the 2001 NFL Draft.

Johnson was selected to the Pro Bowl with the Bengals in 2004 after leading the AFC team in rushing. He employed a bruising style of hard-nosed running that earned him the nickname the "Auburn Rambler."

Early life
Johnson was born in Petersburg, Virginia, approximately 30 miles south of Richmond. His first name, "Burudi", is Swahili and means "cool'" and his middle name "Ali" represents his family's respect and admiration for Muhammad Ali. He began playing football at the age of six with the Ettrick Trojans of the Chesterfield Quarterback League. During his high school career, he played on both offense and defense for the Thomas Dale Knights under head coach Victor Williams, following in the footsteps of Ken Oxendine and William Henderson. During his career, he broke the school's rushing record which was held by his friend, mentor and coach, Henry Jefferson.

After graduation, he enrolled at Butler Community College in El Dorado, Kansas.

College career

Butler Community College
Johnson played for two years at Butler Community College. He helped lead Butler to two national championships, defeating Ricks College in 1998 and Dixie College in 1999. His most memorable performance came against Dixie College in the championship game in which he ran for 375 yards and scored seven touchdowns. He was subsequently named  NJCAA "Player of the Year". Johnson was subsequently inducted into the NJCAA Hall of Fame.

Auburn
At Auburn University, Johnson finished his career with 324 rushing attempts for 1,567 yards (4.84 yards per rush average). His 324 rushing attempts was a school single-season record and his 1,567 rushing yards were the second-most in school history. He had ten games in which he rushed for 100 yards or more. He was named SEC player of the year and nominated for the Doak Walker Award, which was won by LaDainian Tomlinson. He was a sociology major. His fullback was Heath Evans, who would later go onto the NFL as well. NFL running back Ronnie Brown was also a teammate.

Professional career

Pre-Draft

Cincinnati Bengals
The Cincinnati Bengals selected Johnson in the fourth round (100th overall) of the 2001 NFL Draft.

Johnson saw little playing time in his first two NFL seasons. He backed up four-time Pro Bowler Corey Dillon, the Bengals' leading rusher since 1997, and had just 17 carries and seven receptions.

Dillon missed much of the 2003 season with injuries, and Johnson found himself in the starting lineup. He took full advantage of his opportunity, rushing for 957 yards and nine touchdowns, while adding another 146 yards on 21 receptions in just nine games.

After Dillon was traded to the New England Patriots following the 2003 season, Johnson was named the starter. He started every game and set a franchise rushing record with 1,454 yards. In addition, he scored 12 touchdowns and was named to the AFC Pro Bowl team.

Johnson was a major contributor in 2005 season, in which the Bengals reached the playoffs for the first time in 15 years. Johnson remained the starter as a punishing runner providing the running game needed to complement quarterback Carson Palmer and wide receiver Chad Johnson (Ochocinco). Chris Perry, former University of Michigan running back, joined the backfield as the Bengals' first round pick in the 2004 NFL Draft. At the end of the season, the Bengals finished with an 11–5 record, an AFC North Division title, and the team's first winning season since 1990. Johnson broke his own franchise record with 1,458 rushing yards and 12 touchdowns while also recording a career-high 23 receptions for 90 yards.

During the 2007 season, Johnson missed five games to injury, and he had only one game in which he rushed for over 100 yards. He finished the season with 497 yards on 170 carries for three touchdowns.

In August 2008, it was reported that the Bengals were interested in trading Johnson for a "top receiver" to shore up their injured receiving corps, which would leave Chris Perry as the new feature back and either Kenny Watson or DeDe Dorsey as his backup. Bengals head coach Marvin Lewis denied any trade talks involving Johnson. "It's a rumor," he stated. However, on August 27, Johnson stated he expected to be gone "any minute." After a trade fell through, Johnson was released by the team on August 30 during the final roster cuts.

Detroit Lions
Johnson signed a one-year deal with the Detroit Lions on September 1, 2008. The Lions released running back Tatum Bell to make room for Johnson. The following day, Johnson accused Bell of stealing his luggage, although Bell insisted "it was just an honest mistake." In one season with the Lions, Johnson had 237 rushing yards, one rushing touchdown, 88 receiving yards, and one receiving touchdown.

The 2008 season was Johnson's last in the NFL.

Community
The Rudi Johnson Foundation was established in July 2005. The foundation provides assistance to families and children to promote self-sufficiency and self-reliance and incorporates several community-based programs. In 2007, James Farrior of the Pittsburgh Steelers joined the effort, establishing his own foundation to assist in this movement. The foundation helped fund the organization of the first football team for Clark Montessouri High School in Cincinnati. The foundation is a strong supporter of Be The Match, the national registry of the National Bone Marrow Registry, and regularly organizes and conducts donor drives to recruit minorities.

References

External links
Official website 
Detroit Lions bio 
Rudi Johnson Foundation

1979 births
Living people
People from Petersburg, Virginia
African-American players of American football
American football running backs
Auburn Tigers football players
Butler Grizzlies football players
Cincinnati Bengals players
Detroit Lions players
American Conference Pro Bowl players
21st-century African-American sportspeople
20th-century African-American sportspeople